Nikita Andreyevich Volodin (born 29 June 1999) is a Russian pair skater. With his former partner, Alina Ustimkina, he is the 2016 CS Tallinn Trophy champion and 2016 Youth Olympic bronze medalist.

Personal life 
Nikita Andreyevich Volodin was born on 29 June 1999 in Saint Petersburg, Russia.

Career 
Volodin began skating in 2003.

Partnership with Ustimkina 
Volodin and Alina Ustimkina debuted their partnership in September 2014. They competed at events within Russia during their first season together and began appearing internationally in the 2015–16 season. In August 2015, they were sent to Riga, Latvia to compete at their first ISU Junior Grand Prix (JGP) assignment, placing fifth. In November, they won the junior gold medal at the NRW Trophy, outscoring silver medalists Anna Dušková / Martin Bidař by 19.22 points.

In January 2016, Ustimkina/Volodin placed fifth at the Russian Junior Championships. In February, they represented Russia at the 2016 Winter Youth Olympics in Hamar, Norway. Ranked third in both segments, they were awarded the bronze medal behind Ekaterina Borisova / Dmitry Sopot and Dušková/Bidař. Assigned to Team Determination for the mixed NOC team event, Ustimkina/Volodin placed third in their segment and their team finished 8th.

Ustimkina and Volodin ended their partnership in late 2017.

Partnership with Atakhanova 
Volodin and Amina Atakhanova teamed up in early 2018, coached by Alexei Sokolov in Saint Petersburg. In April 2018, they won gold at the Russian Youth Championships Elder Age.

Programs

With Atakhanova

With Ustimkina

Competitive highlights 
CS: Challenger Series; JGP: Junior Grand Prix

With Atakhanova

With Ustimkina

Detailed results

With Ustimkina

References

External links 

 
 

1999 births
Russian male pair skaters
Living people
Figure skaters from Saint Petersburg
Figure skaters at the 2016 Winter Youth Olympics